Telugu culture may refer to:

 Culture of Andhra Pradesh
 Culture of Telangana